Events from the year 1961 in Scotland.

Incumbents 

 Secretary of State for Scotland and Keeper of the Great Seal – John Maclay

Law officers 
 Lord Advocate – William Grant 
 Solicitor General for Scotland – David Colville Anderson

Judiciary 
 Lord President of the Court of Session and Lord Justice General – Lord Clyde
 Lord Justice Clerk – Lord Thomson
 Chairman of the Scottish Land Court – Lord Gibson

Events 
 3 March – Holy Loch becomes the United States Navy's FBM Refit Site One and home base to its Submarine Squadron 14 (equipped with Polaris nuclear missiles) with the arrival of tender USS Proteus.
 10 May – St. Andrew's Catholic Cathedral in Dumfries is destroyed by fire.
 17 May – Rangers F.C. become the first British team to reach a European final but lose the first leg of the Final of the 1960–61 European Cup Winners' Cup at Ibrox, 2-0.
 27 May – Rangers lose the second leg of the Final of the 1960–61 European Cup Winners' Cup, 2-1, to lose over the two legs by 4-1.
 1 September – Border Television goes on air.
 16 September – Three people die and 35 are injured when a stand collapses during a Rangers F.C. football match at Ibrox Park.
 16–17 September – remnants of Atlantic Hurricane Debbie track across Scotland.
 30 September – Grampian Television goes on air.
 13 October – The British Motor Corporation's Bathgate Lorry Plant begins production.
 16 November – Glasgow Bridgeton by-election: Labour retains the seat although the Scottish National Party achieves an 18% share of the vote, only narrowly failing to take second place.
 Completion of Howford Bridge carrying the A76 road over River Ayr near Catrine (the longest reinforced concrete arch span in Scotland at this date); and new Ness Bridge in Inverness.
 Remains of Rosneath House blown up.
 Release of short documentary film Seawards the Great Ships, which will be the first Scottish film to win an Academy Award.
 Caithness Glass established in Wick, Caithness, by Robin Sinclair, 2nd Viscount Thurso.

Births 
 20 January – Janey Godley, comedian and writer
 14 February – Alison Saunders, Director of Public Prosecutions (England and Wales)
 1 April – Susan Boyle, singer
 6 April – Rory Bremner, impressionist, playwright and comedian
 10 April – Nicky Campbell, broadcast presenter
 14 April – Robert Carlyle, actor
 22 April – Ann McKechin, Labour MP from 2001
 6 May – Tom Hunter, entrepreneur and philanthropist
 7 May – Sue Black, forensic anthropologist
 13 May – Ralph Milne, footballer (died 2015)
 16 May – Sarah Boyack, Labour MSP from 1999
 5 June – Rosie Kane, born Rosemary McGarvey, Socialist MSP from 2003 to 2007
 22 June – Jimmy Somerville, pop singer
 24 June – Iain Glen, actor
 10 July – Carol Anne Davis, crime writer
 18 September – Michael McMahon, Labour MSP from 2011
 22 September – Liam Fox, Conservative MP from 1992
 9 November – Jackie Kay, poet and novelist
 23 December – Carol Smillie, television presenter
 29 December – Jim Reid, alternative rock singer-songwriter
 2 December – Richard Quinn, jockey
 30 December – Charlie Nicholas, international footballer
 W. N. Herbert, poet
 Kevin Williamson, political activist

Deaths 
 30 January – John Duncan Fergusson, Scottish Colourist painter (born 1874)
 1 October – Sir William Reid Dick, sculptor (born 1879)
 13 October – John MacCormick, lawyer and advocate of Home Rule (born 1904)

The arts
 Muriel Spark's novel The Prime of Miss Jean Brodie is published.
 Marmalade formed as The Gaylords in Baillieston.

See also 
 1961 in Northern Ireland

References 

 
Scotland
Years of the 20th century in Scotland
1960s in Scotland